The 1963–64 Northern Rugby Football League season was the 69th season of rugby league football.

Season summary
The 1963–64 season saw the league continue to be split into two divisions with each team playing each other team home and away and no playoffs.

Swinton won their sixth Championship.

The Challenge Cup winners were Widnes who beat Hull Kingston Rovers 13–5 in the final.

The 2nd Division Champions were Oldham

Bradford Northern disbanded on 10 December 1963 after playing 13 matches which were then declared null and void, and expunged from the 1963–64 season's records. They had won 1 and lost 12. Their last match on 23 November attracted a club record lowest crowd of just 324 against Barrow.

There was no promotion or relegation as the League returned to one division in 1964–65.

Brian Bevan ended his career with Warrington and Blackpool Borough as the all-time record try scorer with 796.

St. Helens won the Lancashire League and Halifax won the Yorkshire League. St. Helens beat Leigh 15–4 to win the Lancashire County Cup and Halifax beat Featherstone Rovers 10–0 to win the Yorkshire County Cup.

Championship

Second Division

Challenge Cup

Widnes beat Hull Kingston Rovers 13–5 in the Challenge Cup played at Wembley Stadium on 9 May before a crowd of 84,488.

This was Widnes’ third Challenge Cup Final win in five Final appearances. Frank Collier, their prop forward, was awarded the Lance Todd Trophy for his man-of-the-match performance.

Kangaroo tour

The months from September until November also saw the appearance of the Australian team in England on their 1963–64 Kangaroo Tour. Other than the three test Ashes series against Great Britain (won 2–1 by Australia), The Kangaroos played 19 matches against Rugby Football League clubs and county representative sides.

References

Sources
1963-64 Rugby Football League season at wigan.rlfans.com
The Challenge Cup at The Rugby Football League website

1963 in English rugby league
1964 in English rugby league
Northern Rugby Football League seasons